Jean-Baptiste N'Goy Yakassongo (born 20 March 1989) is a Belgian footballer who plays as a winger for RES Acrenoise.

Career
Born in Kinshasa, he made one appearance in the Belgian First Division for Mouscron.

References

External links
 
 

1989 births
Living people
Footballers from Kinshasa
Belgian footballers
Association football forwards
R.E. Mouscron players
R.S.C. Anderlecht players
PFC Minyor Pernik players
FC Lokomotiv 1929 Sofia players
Belgian Pro League players
First Professional Football League (Bulgaria) players
Expatriate footballers in Bulgaria
Democratic Republic of the Congo emigrants to Belgium
Association football midfielders